Elena Vladimirovna Volchetskaya (born 4 December 1944) is a Soviet and Belarusian retired artistic gymnast. She competed at the 1964 Summer Olympics in all artistic gymnastics events and won a gold medal in the team all around competition. Individually her best results were fifth place in the vault and eighth all around.

During her career she won five national titles: three in the vault (1961, 1962, 1965) and two on the balance beam (1963, 1964). In 1966 she broke her ankle. The same year she married, changing her last name to Tyunenkova, and next year gave birth to her first daughter, effectively retiring from sport.

In 1965 she graduated from an institute of pedagogy, and for some 30 years trained gymnasts in her native Grodno. She was the first coach of Olga Korbut, but after one and half years passed her to Renald Knysh, who previously raised Volchetskaya. Between 1998 and 2006 she coached in Minneapolis, United States, together with Nikolai Miligulo and Olga Gotsmanova. In 2006, she returned to Grodno to her 94-year-old mother and daughters Tatyana and Irina.

References

External links 
 

1944 births
Living people
Soviet female artistic gymnasts
Gymnasts at the 1964 Summer Olympics
Olympic gymnasts of the Soviet Union
Olympic gold medalists for the Soviet Union
Olympic medalists in gymnastics
Medalists at the 1964 Summer Olympics